Scopula restricta is a moth of the family Geometridae. It is found on Sulawesi.

References

Moths described in 1997
restricta
Moths of Indonesia